2020–21 Calcutta Women's Football League was the 25th season of the Calcutta Women's Football League, also known as the Kanyashree Cup. SSB Women's won their third title in the ediiton.

Teams

Group A

Table

Matches

Group B

Table 
<onlyinclude>

Matches

Group C

Table

Matches

Super 6

Table

Matches

Knock-out Stages

Semifinals

Finals

References 

2019–20 in Indian football leagues
2019–20 domestic women's association football leagues